Novković (Cyrillic script: Новковић) is a Serbian surname. It may refer to:

Ana Novković (born 1965), Serbian politician
Đorđe Novković (1943–2007), songwriter known for his work in SFR Yugoslavia and Croatia
Boris Novković (born 1967), Croatian pop singer
Rade Novković (born 1980), Serbian footballer
Srđan Novković (born 1983), Serbian footballer

See also
Novaković, surname

Serbian surnames